Kostyuninskaya is a rural locality (a village) in Nizhne-Vazhskoye Rural Settlement, Verkhovazhsky District, Vologda Oblast, Russia. The population was 20 as of 2002.

Geography 
The distance to Verkhovazhye is 11 km, to Naumikha is 12.9 km. Potulovskaya, Kalinino, Matveyevskaya are the nearest rural localities.

References 

Rural localities in Verkhovazhsky District